Asterivora lampadias is a species of moth of the family Choreutidae. It is found in Australia, including Tasmania.

It is found in subalpine and alpine habitats.

Larvae have been reared on the foliage of Brachycome, Helichrysum and other herbaceous plant species.

External links
Australian Faunal Directory
Image at choreutidae.lifedesks.org

Asterivora
Moths of Australia
Moths described in 1907